Eva Margareta Ernström (2 September 1961 – 8 November 2017) was a Swedish long-distance runner. She competed in the women's 3000 metres at the 1984 Summer Olympics.

References

External links
 

1961 births
2017 deaths
Athletes (track and field) at the 1984 Summer Olympics
Swedish female long-distance runners
Olympic athletes of Sweden
Athletes from Stockholm